Azizulah Karzai is a politician in Afghanistan. He served as Ambassador to Russia, a position he held from 28 August 2010 until 2013.

Early years
Azizulah is originally from southern Afghanistan. He belongs to the Karzai-clan of Pashtuns. He is an uncle of former Afghan President Hamid Karzai. Before the Taliban government he was Afghan Ambassador to Poland. He is considered the family's expert on tribal maneuvering. During the United States attack on Afghanistan in November 2001, he said: "Tribalism is more dangerous than the Islamic fundamentalism of the Taliban because it runs throughout Pashtun society."

Ambassador
After the fall of the Taliban government Karzai was appointed Afghan Ambassador to the Czech Republic. He later became aid to the Afghan Foreign Minister and Ambassador to Saudi Arabia. From 2010 until 2013 he served as Afghans Ambassador to Russia.

References

External links

Afghan diplomats
Azizullah
Living people
Ambassadors of Afghanistan to Russia
Ambassadors of Afghanistan to Saudi Arabia
Ambassadors of Afghanistan to the Czech Republic
Pashtun people
2010s in Afghanistan
21st-century Afghan politicians
Year of birth missing (living people)